Helmut Ilk (born 11 July 1936) is an Austrian former freestyle swimmer. He competed in the men's 400 metre freestyle at the 1960 Summer Olympics.

References

External links
 

1936 births
Living people
Olympic swimmers of Austria
Swimmers at the 1960 Summer Olympics
Sportspeople from Linz
Austrian male freestyle swimmers